Saint-Paul-lès-Dax (literally Saint-Paul near Dax; Gascon: Sent Pau d'Acs) is a commune in the Landes department in Nouvelle-Aquitaine in southwestern France.

Population

See also
Communes of the Landes department

References

Communes of Landes (department)